Opglabbeek is a village, former municipality located in the Belgian province of Limburg. In 2018, Opglabbeek had a total population of 10,332. The total area is 24.98 km².

The municipality consisted of the following communities:  Opglabbeek proper, Nieuwe Kempen, and Louwel.

Effective 1 January 2019, Opglabbeek and Meeuwen-Gruitrode were merged into the new municipality of Oudsbergen.

References

External links
 
 Official website 

Populated places in Limburg (Belgium)
Oudsbergen
Former municipalities of Limburg (Belgium)